Audrey McCall Beach is an urban beach along the east bank of the Willamette River, near the Hawthorne Bridge in Portland, Oregon, United States. Named after Audrey McCall and spearheaded by the Human Access Project, the beach opened officially on July 5, 2019.

Human Access Project removed 19 tons of concrete from the beach during 2013–2019 with assistance of volunteers and inmate work crews.

See also

 List of beaches in Oregon

References

External links
 Audrey McCall Beach, Human Access Project

2019 establishments in Oregon
Beaches of Oregon
Hosford-Abernethy, Portland, Oregon
Urban beaches